Olympic Stadium, also known as Opening Stadium, was a temporary stadium in Grenoble, France.  Built to only host the opening ceremonies for the 1968 Winter Olympics, the stadium was immediately disassembled following the games.  The stadium held 60,000 spectators.

References
1968 Winter Olympics official report. pp. 86–7. 
Further information on stadium

External links
I.N.A.: Video in technicolor of opening ceremony, Grenoble, 1968 (french)
Life: Images from 1968 Opening Ceremony

Venues of the 1968 Winter Olympics
Sports venues in Grenoble
Olympic stadiums
Defunct sports venues in France
Sports venues completed in 1968
Sports venues demolished in 1968
Demolished buildings and structures in France